Greg Jones (born 13 January 1996) is an Irish rugby union player who plays in the back row for Ulster in the United Rugby Championship and European Rugby Champions Cup.

Jones was born in Sandycove, Dublin, where he attended St. Andrew's College. He represted Leinster up to 'A' level, and was part of the Ireland under-20s team that beat New Zealand at the 2016 World Rugby Under 20 Championship.

He joined the Ulster academy from University College Dublin in the summer of 2017. He made his senior Ulster debut on 24 November 2017 in round 9 of the 2017–18 Pro14, featuring off the bench in the province's 23–22 win against Italian side Benetton. He signed a senior contract ahead of the 2018–19 season.

References

External links
Ulster Rugby profiles
United Rugby Championship profiles

ItsRugby profile

1996 births
Living people
Rugby union players from County Dublin
Irish rugby union players
Ulster Rugby players
Rugby union number eights
Rugby union flankers
People from Sandycove
Sportspeople from Dún Laoghaire–Rathdown
University College Dublin R.F.C. players
People educated at St Andrew's College, Dublin